Opus Media Partners, L.L.C. was a Limited liability company  that ran radio stations. The company was operated individually out of three cities, Alexandria, Louisiana, Monroe, Louisiana, and Tallahassee, Florida.  Each of the three radio station blocks ran as individual companies under the same name. Opus exited the business on January 6, 2014, when it sold its Louisiana properties to Mapleton Communications. The Tallahassee properties were sold off in November 2013 to newcomer Red Hills Broadcasting.

Former properties
Opus Broadcasting Tallahassee, LLC
 WWOF
 WANK
 WHTF
 WQTL
Opus Broadcasting Monroe, LLC
 KXRR
 KQLQ
 KZRZ
 KMYY
Opus Broadcasting Alexandria, LLC
 KLAA
 KEZP
 KBKK
 KEDG

References

External links
 Opus Media Partners official website

Defunct radio broadcasting companies of the United States